These are the list of the party-list groups (and their nominees) who are qualified for the 2016 Philippine House of Representatives elections.

139 party-list groups were part of the "initial list" of candidates for the 2016 elections, released by the Commission of Elections on January 22, 2016. The party-list slots were drawn via electronic raffle. It only trimmed down to 115 after the COMELEC released the final list of party-list groups that would be included in the printed ballots.

The list of the partylist and their nominees are available online on the COMELEC's website.

List

Notes

 Silvestre Bello III was supposed to be the party-list's 1st nominee, but later withdrew after he endorsed the presidential candidacy of Rodrigo Duterte, from Jejomar Binay. Victorino Atienza took his place.

References

2016 Philippine general election